Abraham Guié Guié (born 25 July 1986) is an Ivorian former professional footballer who played as a winger or striker.

Club career
Guié Guié played for Jomo Cosmos in the South African Premier Soccer League. He was in the Budapest Honvéd FC team that reached the third round of European League in 2009–10 season and was a member of the team that won the 2008–09 Cup of Hungary.

In the summer of 2010, he signed for Tours FC, in the French second division. In the first 17 matches with the French club, he found the net 10 times.

In June 2014, after spending the previous season with Apollon Limassol on loan from OGC Nice, Guié Guié was sold to the Cypriot club.

In October 2017, he announced his retirement due a heart problem.

International career
Guié was a striker who played for the Ivory Coast at the 2008 Summer Olympics in China.

Honours
Budapest Honvéd
 Hungarian Cup: 2006–07, 2008–09, runners-up: 2007–08
 Hungarian Super Cup: runners-up: 2007, 2009

Apollon Limassol
 Cyprus Cup: 2015–16, 2016-2017

References

External links
 

1986 births
Living people
People from San-Pédro, Ivory Coast
Association football forwards
Ivorian footballers
Ivory Coast international footballers
Olympic footballers of Ivory Coast
Footballers at the 2008 Summer Olympics
Ivorian expatriate footballers
Ivorian expatriate sportspeople in South Africa
Ivorian expatriate sportspeople in Hungary
Ivorian expatriate sportspeople in France
Ivorian expatriate sportspeople in Switzerland
Ivorian expatriate sportspeople in Cyprus
Expatriate soccer players in South Africa
Expatriate footballers in Hungary
Expatriate footballers in France
Expatriate footballers in Switzerland
Expatriate footballers in Cyprus
Jomo Cosmos F.C. players
Budapest Honvéd FC players
Tours FC players
OGC Nice players
US Orléans players
FC Lausanne-Sport players
Apollon Limassol FC players
Nemzeti Bajnokság I players
Ligue 1 players
Ligue 2 players
Swiss Super League players
Cypriot First Division players